Charlestown is a village in Glossopdale, Derbyshire, England. It is in the Simmondley Ward of the High Peak District Council. The village is situated on the A624 road between Glossop and Hayfield.

References

Towns and villages of the Peak District
Villages in Derbyshire
High Peak, Derbyshire